Each grade 7 & 8 student in the Greater Essex County District School Board, in Windsor, Ontario and Essex County, Ontario in Canada, will visit one of two centres for 7 full day sessions.  Technology basics are presented through hands-on activities and a series of challenges.  The level of student achievement is integrated with the home school Science and Technology assessment. The centre's mission is to provide the environment, materials, tools and resources necessary for students to discover the 
impact of technology in today's society.

History 

In 1993 the Essex County Board of Education developed the Design 2000 Complex to introduce the grade 7 and 8 students to the excitement of design and technology.  Providing the very latest in educational technology and incorporating a new understanding of learning styles, the Complex taught the students the skills necessary to deal with the ever changing expectations from business and industry.

The Design 2000 Complex was unique in the province in that it involved a partnership with the student's home school. Rather than dealing with Technology and Family Studies in isolation the students blended these subjects within the existing curriculum. For example, Desk T op Publishing involves writing skills to produce the text of the document as well as computer skills to format the finished product. The Language Arts skills were evaluated by the students home room teacher as usual while the computer skills were evaluated by the Complex staff. Other modules integrated areas such as Science, Canadian Studies, Arts and Music in a similar manner.

In 1999 after the amalgamation of the city and county public boards of education into the Greater Essex County District School Board, changes were made to the curriculum to bring it into line with the new Ontario Science and Technology Curriculum. With these changes the Complex was renamed to " The Essex Elementary Technology Center" to differentiate it from the newly established second complex known as "The Herman Elementary Technology Center" in Windsor.

External links
 GECDSB Elementary Technology Centres

High schools in Windsor, Ontario